The Office of Advocacy of the U.S. Small Business Administration represents the views of small business to Congress, the White House, federal agencies, federal courts, and state policymakers. It is an independent federal government office housed within the Small Business Administration and created by act of Congress in 1976. It is led by a Chief Counsel for Advocacy who is nominated by the president and confirmed by the U.S. Senate. Its functions include representing the views of small entities in federal rulemaking, conducting economic research on small businesses issues and trends, and gathering information from small entities nationwide.

References

External links
Office of Advocacy at the Small Business Administration
SBA Office of Advocacy: Overview, History, and Current Issues, by Robert Jay Dilger, February 18, 2016. Library of Congress: Congressional Research Service.

1976 establishments in Washington, D.C.
Government agencies established in 1976
Organizations based in Washington, D.C.
Small Business Administration